Omoiosicista is an extinct genus of dipodid rodent which existed in central Nei Mongol, China, during the early Miocene (middle Burdigalian age). It was first named by Yuri Kimura in 2010 and the type species is Omoiosicista fui.

References

Dipodidae
Miocene mammals of Asia
Miocene rodents
Fossil taxa described in 2010